Manduca hannibal is a moth of the  family Sphingidae.

Distribution 
It is found from Mexico, Belize, Nicaragua and Costa Rica to Suriname, Venezuela, Ecuador, Brazil, Bolivia and north-eastern Argentina.

Description 
The wingspan is 99–114 mm. There is a whitish subbasal band on the hindwing upperside and a generally rather large dirty white patch within the black central band near the anal angle.

Biology 
There are multiple generations per year in Costa Rica, with adults recorded year round except January and March. In Bolivia, adults have been recorded in February, April, August, October and December.

The larvae feed on Aegiphila martinicensis.

Subspecies
Manduca hannibal hannibal (from Mexico, Belize, Nicaragua and Costa Rica to Surinam, Venezuela, Ecuador, Brazil and Bolivia)
Manduca hannibal hamilcar (Boisduval, 1875) (Brazil and north-eastern Argentina)
Manduca hannibal mayeri (Mooser, 1940) (Mexico)

References

Manduca
Moths described in 1779
Taxa named by Pieter Cramer